Ocnerogyia is a monotypic moth genus in the subfamily Lymantriinae. Its only species, Ocnerogyia amanda, is found in Iran. Both the genus and the species were first described by Staudinger in 1892.

References

Lymantriinae
Monotypic moth genera